Newlyn is a small town and fishing port in the civil parish of Penzance, Cornwall, United Kingdom.

 Tredavoe

Trereife

References

Citations

Sources

 
 
 
 
 
 
 
 
 
 
 
 
 
 
 
 
 
 
 
 
 
 
 
 
 
 
 
 
 
 
 
 
 
 
 
 
 

 Tredavoe
 
 
 
 
 

 Trereife
 

Buildings and structures in Cornwall
Lists of listed buildings in Cornwall
Newlyn